The Conservative Party is a name used by many political parties around the world. These political parties are generally right-wing though their exact ideologies can range from center-right to far-right.

Political parties called The Conservative Party include:

Europe

Current
Croatian Conservative Party,
Conservative Party (Czech Republic)
Conservative People's Party (Denmark)
Conservative Party of Georgia
Conservative Party (Norway)
Conservative Party (UK)
The Conservatives (Latvia)

Historical
Conservative Party (Bulgaria), 1879–1884
Conservative Party (Kingdom of Serbia), 1861-1895
German Conservative Party, 1876–1918
Conservative Party (Hungary), 1846–1849
Conservative Party (Iceland), 1924–1927
Conservative Party (Prussia), 1848–1876
Vlad Țepeș League, in Romania 1929–1938
Conservative Party (Romania, 1880–1918)
Conservative Party (Romania), 1991–2015
Conservative Party (Spain), 1876–1931
Tories, Britain and Ireland 1678–1834; the roots of the Conservative Party (UK)

Africa
Conservative Party (Egypt)
Conservative Party (Kenya)
Conservative Party (South Africa)
Conservative Party (Uganda)

Americas

Canada
 Conservative Labour, in Canada
 Conservative Party of Canada (1867–1942)
 Conservative Party of Canada (founded 2003)
 Liberal-Conservative Party, name until 1873 and 1922–1938
 National Liberal and Conservative Party, 1920–1921
 Nationalist Conservative, in Canada
 Progressive Conservative Party (disambiguation)

United States
 Conservative Party (United States)
 New Jersey Conservative Party
 Conservative Party of New York State
 Conservative Party (South Carolina)
 Conservative Party of Virginia (1867)
 Conservative Party of Virginia (1965)

Others
Conservative Party (Bolivia)
Conservative Party (Brazil)
Conservative Party (Chile), 1836–1948
United Conservative Party (Chile), 1953–1966
Colombian Conservative Party
Conservative Party (Ecuador)
Conservative Party (Guatemala), c. 1830–1920
Conservative Party (Mexico),  1849–1867
Conservative Party (Nicaragua)
Conservative Party (Panama)
Conservative Party (Venezuela)

Asia
 Democratic Conservative Party (Syria), also simply known as the "Conservative Party"

Oceania

Australia
 Australian Conservatives

New Zealand
 Conservative Party of New Zealand
 New Zealand Conservative Party
 New Zealand National Party

Elsewhere
Conservative Party (Hong Kong)
New Conservative Party (Japan), Japan 2000–2003

See also
 
 Conservatism (disambiguation)
 Conservative Alliance (disambiguation)
 Conservative Christianity
 Conservative Democratic Party (disambiguation)
 Conservative government, a list of Canadian and British Conservative governments
 Conservative Party leadership election (disambiguation)
 Conservative People's Party (disambiguation)
 Leader of the Conservative Party (disambiguation)
 List of conservative parties by country
 List of Conservative Party politicians
 New Conservative Party (disambiguation)
 Conservative Catholics (Italy)
 Conservative Nationalist Party
 Conservative Party Archive
 Conservative Party Review (2016)
 The Conservative (1898-1902), a weekly newspaper in Nebraska
 The Conservative (journal)

Lists of political parties